The national emblem of the Dagestan Autonomous Soviet Socialist Republic was adopted in 1937 by the government of the Dagestan Autonomous Soviet Socialist Republic. The emblem is identical to the emblem of the Russian Soviet Federative Socialist Republic.

History

First version 
On December 7, 1921, the First All-Dagestani Congress of Soviets adopted the Constitution of the Dagestan ASSR. According to this document, the emblem of the Dagestan ASSR was an image in the rays of the sun crossed golden sickle and hammer with arms downward, surrounded by a crown of ears, all this was accompanied by the inscription: "Dagestan Autonomous Socialist Soviet Republic" and "Proletarians of all countries, unite!"

Proposed emblem 
In 1926, a proposed emblem was created. The design of the emblem included a mountain range. This project was rejected.

Second version 
On April 5, 1927, the 6th All-Dagestani Congress of Soviets adopted the Constitution of the Dagestan ASSR, which approved the emblem of the republic. 

It consisted of the image of the sun rising over a snowy ridge, against the background of the mountains were placed criss-cross sickle and hammer, under which were depicted a vine, corn and wheat ears; on the sides are drawn rocks. All this was in the middle of the silver gear, the inner circle of which was the motto "Workers of all countries, unite!" in Russian and Turkic languages. The name of the republic was written in gold letters on the gear oval: "The Dagestan Autonomous Soviet Socialist Republic". The inscriptions were performed in Latin and Arabic fonts.

Third version 
From 1936, the emblem of Dagestan ASSR became similar to the emblem of the RSFSR. The only difference was in the motto, which in the Dagestan emblem was cited in 10 languages: Russian, Avar, Kumyk, Dargin, Lezgin, Turkic, Nogai, Lak, Tat, Tabasaran.

The emblem was reconfirmed on June 12, 1937, in the 11th All-Dagestani of Soviets, which adopted the Constitution of the Dagestan ASSR (approved at the III session of the Supreme Soviet of the RSFSR in 1940).

First revision 
In 1938, the Turkic and Nogai inscription was replaced by Azerbaijani inscription.

Second revision 
In February 1938, the scripts of the language of Dagestan was standardized to Cyrillic script. The inscriptions now look like :

Third revision 
On May 30, 1978, the 8th session of the Supreme Council of the Dagestan ASSR of the 9th convocation adopted a new Constitution. The languages of the inscriptions were added, there were 11 of them: Russian, Avar, Azerbaijani, Dargin, Kumyk, Lak, Lezgin, Nogai, Tabasaran, Tat and Chechen.

Gallery

References 

Dagestan Autonomous Soviet Socialist Republic
Dagestan ASSR
Dagestan ASSR
Dagestan ASSR
Dagestan ASSR
Dagestan ASSR